Sean James Caisse (born January 30, 1986) is an American former stock car racing driver.

Career

Caisse rose through the ranks of karting to full-size stock cars at Lee USA Speedway in Lee, New Hampshire. He progressed from Hobby Stocks to Late Models and beyond while still a teenager. In 2002 Caisse finished second in the Hobby Stock category at the local speedway. For 2003 Caisse joined the Northeastern Midget Association. Caisse's best results were two second-place finishes at Oswego Speedway and Star Speedway. The driver from New Hampshire finished seventh in the season standings.

He then joined the NASCAR Featherlite Modified Series in 2004. With owner Art Barry, he won a pole and also drove in the NASCAR Busch North Series. After leaving Barry's operation, he made his NASCAR Grand National Division, Busch North Series debut at New Hampshire International Speedway. 2005 saw Caisse make a run at Rookie of the Year in Busch North driving for Barney McRae. He won two poles and finishing in the top five twice as well on his way to finishing seventh in series points. In 2006, Caisse drove for a new team, Andy Santerre Motorsports and sponsored by Casella Waste Systems. The combination won the first time out at Greenville-Pickens Speedway, and totaled three times in eleven races, finishing, the season with six top-fives and eight top-tens, and second in points to Mike Olsen.

Caisse also made his NASCAR Busch Series debut during 2006, racing at Dover International Speedway for Kevin Harvick, Inc. He plans to participate in more races for the NASCAR Busch Series in 2007. He is set to make his Craftsman Truck Series debut with Germain Racing in their Research & development No. 03 Toyota, sponsored by Casella.

Sean went on in the Busch East series to win 4 races total as well as the final race at Dover Speedway, He finished second in the NASCAR Busch East Series Championship. He went to Irwindale California for the Toyota All Star Showdown in November to earn the Pole and lead the first 74 laps before being spun by a lapped car, ending his night early. The following year Caisse again competed in the NASCAR Busch East Series. Caisse won four races earning him the second place in the championship again.

In 2008 the racing driver moved to Mooresville, North Carolina. Due to the economic crisis Caisse was left without a sponsor. Caisse also became a frequent competitor in the NASCAR Busch Series and the NASCAR Nationwide Series. After his debut race in 2006, crashing at Dover International Speedway, Caisse joined Richard Childress Racing for two races in 2009. A 22nd place at New Hampshire International Speedway was is best result. In 2009 Caisse won one ARCA RE/MAX race, at Rockingham Speedway. Caisse ran five Nationwide Series races in 2010. Eighteenth was the drivers best finish, at Nashville Superspeedway.

Caisse ran his last professional auto race in 2012. Racing a MacDonald Motorsports Dodge Caisse finished seventeenth in a NASCAR K&N Pro Series East race at Bowman Gray Stadium.

Personal life
In 2008 Caisse had a relationship with model Whitney Kay. In 2010 the two had a daughter, Brielle. In May 2010 Caisse and Kay got married. The two filed for divorce in October 2011. Kay later remarried in January 2014 with her current husband, former NASCAR driver, Brian Scott.

Assault charges
In 2013 Caisse made a sexual assault complaint against Andy Cusack, owner of Beech Ridge Motor Speedway. During the following 13 months Caisse threatened Cusack to file more sexual assault charges. In late 2014 Cusack and Caisse met in person. Cusack offered Caisse a petition to sign that stated the sexual assault charges were false. Caisse did not sign the petition and left the meeting for time to think about the statement. The following night Caisse returned to Cusack's home in Scarborough, Maine. After Cusack stepped outside Caisse started to beat him. In February 2015, Caisse was extradited to Maine where he awaited trial. During the proceedings, Cusack claimed that an unnamed citizen of Gorham, Maine, who had also filed a legal action against Cusack in 2017 on similar grounds, colluded with Caisse in an attempt to blackmail him.

Motorsports career results

NASCAR
(key) (Bold – Pole position awarded by qualifying time. Italics – Pole position earned by points standings or practice time. * – Most laps led.)

Nationwide Series

Craftsman Truck Series

K&N Pro Series East

Winston Modified Tour

 Season still in progress
 Ineligible for series points

ARCA Re/Max Series
(key) (Bold – Pole position awarded by qualifying time. Italics – Pole position earned by points standings or practice time. * – Most laps led.)

 Season still in progress
 Ineligible for series points

References

External links
 
 

1986 births
Living people
NASCAR drivers
People from Pelham, New Hampshire
Racing drivers from New Hampshire
ARCA Menards Series drivers
Richard Childress Racing drivers